The  First Methodist Episcopal Church, built in 1924, is a historic red brick Gothic Revival church located at 200 NW 2nd Street in Okeechobee, Florida. In 1989, it was listed in A Guide to Florida's Historic Architecture, published by the University of Florida Press.  In August 2015, it was listed on the U.S. National Register of Historic Places, as the First Methodist Episcopal Church, South.

Today it is known as First United Methodist Church.

References

External links

Churches in Okeechobee County, Florida
United Methodist churches in Florida
Gothic Revival church buildings in Florida
Churches completed in 1924
20th-century Methodist church buildings in the United States
Churches on the National Register of Historic Places in Florida
National Register of Historic Places in Okeechobee County, Florida
1924 establishments in Florida